The 1887 American Cup was the third edition of the soccer tournament organized by the American Football Association. For the third time since its inception the Clark ONT's were the champions.

Participants
The tournament had now increased to nine teams with Newark boasting four entries including the newcomers Tiffany Rovers. The Rovers, established in 1885, played out of Caledonian Park and wore amber and black striped jerseys with white knickerbockers.
Trenton- Trenton F.B.C.
New York- West Side, Pilgrims, and New York F.B.C.
Paterson- Paterson F.B.C.
Newark- Clark O.N.T., Alma, Tiffany Rovers, and Kearny Rangers.

First round
Pilgrims drew a bye

Rangers: GK J.Clynch, DF J.McKell, James Chapman, MF William Allsop, J.Hearn, D.Morris, FW William Taylor, J.Williams, George Sergeant, D.Gloak, Walter Taylor(c). Rovers: GK G.Gray, DF T.Crann, J.Shelby, MF J.McCullough, F.Hatfield, D.O'Mara, FW C.Gray, A.Ringley, W.Houston, W.Hinchley, J.Norton.

O.N.T.: Patrick Hughes, Harry Holden, A.Pallister, J.Dockray, Joe Swithenby(c), James Howarth, J.Hood, Jack Swithenby, James McGurck, J.Swarbrick, J.Connolly. Almas: Frank Farrow, C.Moore, George Wright, E.Morton, R.Patterson, F.Britchtord, Joseph Lucas, George Curtin(c), E.P.Garren, John Gray, T.Faulkeley.

Paterson: GK Dowey, DF B.Henshall(c), J.Hall, MF G.Henshall, E.Gaskell, J.Henshall, FW W.Wyatt, William Turner, J.W.Warburton, S.Wardle, R.McWilliams. Trenton: GK W.Bradshaw, DF R.Rhodes, Holowan, MF T.McNicol, T.Baddeley, J.James, FW J.Bradshaw, E.Naylor, E.Ward, A.Dearden, D.Baggeley.

replay

Trenton: GK Hart Everingham, DF Hullman, Rhodes, MF McNicol(c), James, Baddeley, FW Openshaw, Ward, Naylor, Baggeley, Deardon.

Second round
ONT draws a bye.

Trenton: GK Hart Everingham, DF Hullman, Rhodes, MF McNicol(c), James, Baddeley, FW Ward, Openshaw, Naylor, Baggeley, Deardon.

Semifinal round
Kearny Rangers draw a bye.

O.N.T.: Patrick Hughes, Harry Holden, A.Patterson, J.Swithemby, L.Dockray, James Howarth, James McGurck, J.Brooks, R.Donnelly, Joseph Swarbrick, J.Swithemby. Trenton: H.Evenham, G.Holman, R.Rhodes, A.MacNicol, J.James, T.Bradley, E.Openshaw, D.Bagley, A.Reardon, E.Naylor, J.Mart.

Final round

American Cup bracket

Champions

References

Sources
Outing
National Police Gazette
New York Herald
New York Times
Spirit of the Times
Trenton Times
Morning Register
Daily Advertiser
Evening News
Sunday Call

1887
1887 in association football
1887 in American sports